= Burmese Empire =

Burmese Empire could refer to:

- Pagan Kingdom (849–1297), or "First Burmese Empire"
- Taungoo Dynasty (1486–1752), or "Second Burmese Empire"
- Konbaung Dynasty (1752–1885), or "Third Burmese Empire"
